Winsel Creek (also called Windsell Creek) is a stream in Crawford and Franklin Counties in the U.S. state of Missouri. It is a tributary of Spring Creek in Franklin County.

The stream headwaters arise in northern Crawford County just west of Sullivan (at ). The stream flows northeast past the north side of Sullivan and crosses under I-44 north of Oak Grove then turns to the northwest and crosses under I-44 again. The stream meanders to the northwest to its confluence with Spring Creek (at ).

Windsel derives its name from a local pioneer citizen named Windsell.

See also
List of rivers of Missouri

References

Rivers of Crawford County, Missouri
Rivers of Franklin County, Missouri
Rivers of Missouri